Platinum-samarium is a binary inorganic compound of platinum and samarium with the chemical formula PtSm. This intermetallic compound forms crystals.

Synthesis
Fusion of stoichiometric amounts of pure substances:

Physical properties
Platinum-samarium forms crystals of rhombic crystal system, space group P nma, cell parameters a = 0.7148 nm, b = 0.4501 nm, c = 0.5638 nm, Z = 4, structure similar to that of iron boride (FeB).

The compound melts congruently at a temperature of ≈1810 °C.

References

Samarium compounds
Platinum compounds
Inorganic compounds
Intermetallics